Dajia Lake or Tak Kyel Tso, is a lake in Saga County in the Shigatse Prefecture of the Tibet Autonomous Region of China. It is located about half way between Lake Peiku and Zhari Namco, northeast of Saga.

References

Saga County
Lakes of Tibet